Marie-Jeanne Larrivée, born Marie-Jeanne Lemière (Sedan, Ardennes, 1733 – Paris, 1786) was a French soprano.

Biography
Marie-Jeanne Larrivée was a prominent member of the Paris Opera company, where she made her debut in 1750 under the name of Mlle Lemière (also spelt Lemierre or Le Mière). She was the sister of violinist Jacques Lemière and cellist Jacques-Louis Lemière both engaged at the Paris Opera in the same period. Her parents were Louis-Michel Lemière, a wig maker, and Julienne Lemière.

After performing several light roles as a cover, at the beginning of 1752 Lemière left the theater scene. She probably intended to improve her voice, but her five-year absence from the stage was mainly related to her stormy relationship with the Duke of Gramont, whose abusive behaviour, even bordering on rape, darkened this period of her life. In July 1752 she gave birth to her first daughter, Marie-Antoinette, but neither of the parents acknowledged her, and only her grandfather offered himself as godfather. In 1756 she finally managed to break up with the Duke and the following year she was readmitted to the Opéra with increased salary.

The parts played by Mlle Lemière included roles in the operas Silvie, Omphale (Cardonne), Ovide et Julie (as Julie), Salimes and Céphale et Procris (Grétry). Larrivée-Lemière retired from the theater in 1777. In 1762 she had married her partner, Henri Larrivée, and had two daughters: pianist, harpsichordist and composer Camille Larrivée and violinist Agathe Elisabeth Henriette Larrivée. In 1767, the Larrivées separated. Their two daughters went on to live with their aunt and guardian, Elisabeth-Henriette Larrivée and toured through French provinces in concerts.

Marie-Jeanne Larrivée-Lemière was also considered one of the most esteemed singers of the Concert Spirituel, where she regularly performed between 1750 and 1763, and then more irregularly until 1778, when she retired with a pension of 2,000 francs annually.

Roles debuted

References

Sources 
 Sylvie Bouissou, Larrivée, Marie-Jeanne Lemière, épouse, in id.,  Pascal Denécheau e France Marchal-Ninosque (eds), Dictionnaire de l'Opéra de Paris sous l'Ancien Régime (1669–1791), Paris, Classiques Garnier, 2019, III (H–O), pp. 397–400 
 David Charlton Opera in the Age of Rousseau: Music, Confrontation, Realism, Cambridge University Press, 2012.
 Félix Clément and Pierre Larousse Dictionnaire des Opéras, Paris, 1881.
 
 
 Lemière, Marie-Jeanne, voir Larrivée (1733–1786) / Noms / Autres index / Parcourir / Accueil – Portail Philidor
 Dictionnaire de la musique en France aux XVIIe  et XVIIIe siècles, sous la direction de Marcelle Benoit, édition Fayard, 1992.
 Charles Dill Opera Remade, 1700–1750, University of Wisconsin, Madison, 2016.

1733 births
1786 deaths
French operatic sopranos
People from Sedan, Ardennes